Tòn Cónsul Vivar (born 1 April 1998) is a Spanish pair skater. With his former skating partner, Laura Barquero, he is the 2020 Spanish national champion and competed in the final segment at the 2020 European Championships.

Cónsul is the 2017 Spanish junior national champion in men's singles and in pairs with Alexanne Bouillon, as well as the 2018 Spanish junior national champion in pairs with Isabella Gamez.

Personal life 
Cónsul was born on 1 April 1998 in Vielha e Mijaran, Lleida, Spain. His favorite skaters are Javier Fernández and Stéphane Lambiel. Cónsul is a business administration student at Pompeu Fabra University.

Career

Early career 
Cónsul began skating in 2006 in Val d'Aran under his first coach Nathalie Pardos. He competed in men's singles up through the 2016–17 season, winning several international medals and the 2017 Spanish junior national title. As a singles skater, he trained in Barcelona under Patrick Capmartín and Marta Andrade.

Cónsul competed pairs with Mónica Carratalá for two seasons, beginning in the 2012–13 season. Together, they were the 2012 Open d'Andorra champions and the 2014 Spanish novice national champions. He later moved to Montreal, Canada to team up with Canadian skater Alexanne Bouillon and train with pairs coaches Bruno Marcotte, Richard Gauthier, Sylvie Fullum, and Nicholas Young. Bouillon/Cónsul won the 2017 Spanish junior national title and competed in the final segment at the 2017 World Junior Championships, finishing 16th. Cónsul began competing solely in pairs from the 2017–18 season. Competing for Spain with American skater Isabella Gamez, he is the 2018 Spanish junior national champion and the 2018 Mentor Toruń Cup champion. Gamez/Cónsul finished 13th at the 2018 World Junior Championships.

Cónsul left skating in mid-2018 and thus did not compete during the 2018–19 season.

2019–2020 season 
In July 2019, Cónsul teamed up with Laura Barquero. They trained under her coaches Barbara Luoni, Franca Bianconi, and Rosana Murante in Bergamo, Italy.

The team made their international debut in October 2019 at the Denis Ten Memorial Challenge, where they won the silver medal and earned the technical minimums for both Europeans and Worlds. They then won bronze at the IceLab International Cup. Competing on the ISU Challenger Series, Barquero/Cónsul finished fourth at the 2019 CS Warsaw Cup and eighth at the 2019 CS Golden Spin of Zagreb. In their first season together, they won the national title at the 2020 Spanish Championships,  ahead of Dorota Broda / Pedro Betegón.

At the 2020 European Championships, Barquero/Cónsul were 15th in the short program and 14th in the free skating to finish 14th overall. Although they expressed disappointment with their mistakes, they were happy with their progress over the course of their short partnership. Together with teammates Broda/Betegón, Barquero/Cónsul made history for the Spanish Ice Sports Federation by marking the first time two Spanish pairs had competed at the European Championships.

In February 2020, Barquero/Cónsul finished ninth at the Challenge Cup. They were named to the 2020 World Championships team, but the competition was cancelled due to the COVID-19 pandemic.
On 26 June 2020, it was announced that the pair had split after only one season together.

Programs

With Barquero

With Gamez

With Bouillon

Men's singles

Competitive highlights 
CS: Challenger Series; JGP: Junior Grand Prix

With Barquero

With Gamez

With Bouillon

With Carratalá

Men's singles

Detailed results 
Small medals for short and free programs awarded only at ISU Championships.

With Barquero

References

External links 
 
 
 
 

1998 births
Spanish male pair skaters
Spanish male single skaters
Living people